Siiri Oviir (born 3 November 1947) is an Estonian politician and Member of the European Parliament.

Oviir was born in Tallinn. As an MEP, she belonged to the Estonian Centre Party until she decided to leave on 9 April 2012.

Oviir is married to civil servant Mihkel Oviir. Her daughter is politician Liisa Oviir.

References

External links
 European Parliament biography

1947 births
Living people
Politicians from Tallinn
Government ministers of Estonia
Estonian Centre Party politicians
Estonian Centre Party MEPs
MEPs for Estonia 2004–2009
MEPs for Estonia 2009–2014
Women MEPs for Estonia
Recipients of the Order of the National Coat of Arms, 3rd Class
Recipients of the Order of the National Coat of Arms, 5th Class
Members of the Riigikogu, 1992–1995
Members of the Riigikogu, 1995–1999
Members of the Riigikogu, 1999–2003
Members of the Riigikogu, 2003–2007
Women government ministers of Estonia
Women members of the Riigikogu
University of Tartu alumni
20th-century Estonian politicians
21st-century Estonian politicians
Members of the Riigikogu, 2007–2011